This is a list of female goalkeepers who have been named in the national water polo team for the Summer Olympics.

Abbreviations

Winning goalkeepers

The following table is pre-sorted by edition of the Olympics (in ascending order), cap number or name of the goalkeeper (in ascending order), respectively. Last updated: 1 April 2021.

Legend and abbreviation
  – Olympic winning streak (winning three or more Olympic titles in a row)
  – Winning all matches during the tournament
  – Host team
 Eff % – Save efficiency (Saves / Shots)

Source:
 Official Results Books (PDF): 2000 (p. 96), 2004 (pp. 72–73), 2008 (pp. 71–72), 2012 (pp. 368–369), 2016 (pp. 218–219).

Records and statistics

Age records
The following tables show the oldest and youngest water polo goalkeepers in the women's Olympic water polo tournament. Last updated: 1 April 2021.

Oldest goalkeepers
Legend
  – Host team

Youngest goalkeepers
Legend
  – Host team

Multiple appearances

By tournament
The following table is pre-sorted by edition of the Olympics (in ascending order), name of the team (in ascending order), name of the goalkeeper (in ascending order), respectively. Last updated: 1 April 2021.

As of 2016, fifteen female goalkeepers have been named in the national water polo team squad in two or more Olympic tournaments.

Legend
 Team* – Host team

Three-time Olympians
The following table is pre-sorted by number of Olympic appearances (in descending order), year of the last Olympic appearance (in ascending order), year of the first Olympic appearance (in ascending order), date of birth (in ascending order), name of the goalkeeper (in ascending order), respectively. Last updated: 1 April 2021.

Two female goalkeepers have been named in the national water polo team squad in three or more Olympic tournaments between 2000 and 2016 inclusive.

Legend and abbreviation
  – Hosts
 Apps – Appearances

Multiple medalists

The following table is pre-sorted by total number of Olympic medals (in descending order), number of Olympic gold medals (in descending order), number of Olympic silver medals (in descending order), year of receiving the last Olympic medal (in ascending order), year of receiving the first Olympic medal (in ascending order), name of the goalkeeper (in ascending order), respectively. Last updated: 1 April 2021.

As of 2016, three female goalkeepers have won two or more Olympic medals in water polo.

Legend
  – Hosts

Most saves

One match

One tournament

All-time

Goalkeepers by team
The following tables are pre-sorted by edition of the Olympics (in ascending order), cap number or name of the goalkeeper (in ascending order), respectively.

Legend
 Year* – As host team

Australia
 Women's national team: 
 Team appearances: 5 (2000*–2016)
 As host team: 2000*

Brazil
 Women's national team: 
 Team appearances: 1 (2016*)
 As host team: 2016*
 Last updated: 1 April 2021.

Legend and abbreviation
  – Hosts
 Eff % – Save efficiency (Saves / Shots)

Source:
 Official Results Books (PDF): 2016 (pp. 200–201).

Canada
 Women's national team: 
 Team appearances: 2 (2000–2004)
 As host team: —

China
 Women's national team: 
 Team appearances: 3 (2008*–2016)
 As host team: 2008*

Great Britain
 Women's national team: 
 Team appearances: 1 (2012*)
 As host team: 2012*
 Last updated: 1 April 2021.

Legend and abbreviation
  – Hosts
 Eff % – Save efficiency (Saves / Shots)

Source:
 Official Results Books (PDF): 2012 (pp. 356–357).

Greece
 Women's national team: 
 Team appearances: 2 (2004*–2008)
 As host team: 2004*

Hungary
 Women's national team: 
 Team appearances: 4 (2004–2016)
 As host team: —

Italy
 Women's national team: 
 Team appearances: 4 (2004–2016)
 As host team: —

Kazakhstan
 Women's national team: 
 Team appearances: 2 (2000–2004)
 As host team: —
 Last updated: 1 April 2021.

Abbreviation
 Eff % – Save efficiency (Saves / Shots)

Source:
 Official Results Books (PDF): 2000 (p. 98), 2004 (pp. 76–77).
Note:
 Galina Rytova is also listed in section Russia.

Netherlands
 Women's national team: 
 Team appearances: 2 (2000, 2008)
 As host team: —

Russia
 Women's national team: 
 Team appearances: 5 (2000–2016)
 As host team: —
 
Note:
 Galina Rytova is also listed in section Kazakhstan.

Spain
 Women's national team: 
 Team appearances: 2 (2012–2016)
 As host team: —

United States
 Women's national team: 
 Team appearances: 5 (2000–2016)
 As host team: —

See also
 Water polo at the Summer Olympics

 Lists of Olympic water polo records and statistics
 List of men's Olympic water polo tournament records and statistics
 List of women's Olympic water polo tournament records and statistics
 List of Olympic champions in men's water polo
 List of Olympic champions in women's water polo
 National team appearances in the men's Olympic water polo tournament
 National team appearances in the women's Olympic water polo tournament
 List of players who have appeared in multiple men's Olympic water polo tournaments
 List of players who have appeared in multiple women's Olympic water polo tournaments
 List of Olympic medalists in water polo (men)
 List of Olympic medalists in water polo (women)
 List of men's Olympic water polo tournament top goalscorers
 List of women's Olympic water polo tournament top goalscorers
 List of men's Olympic water polo tournament goalkeepers
 List of Olympic venues in water polo

References

Sources

ISHOF

External links
 Olympic water polo – Official website

Goalkeepers, Women
Lists of women by occupation